Tanvir Ahmad Khan (12 June 1932 – 16 November 2013) was a career diplomat from Pakistan.

Early life
Khan was born to the Niazi Pathans of Hoshiarpur, in north-eastern Punjab, in June 1932. His father, Nazir Ahmad Khan, was an educationist who spent his working life striving to uplift the educational abilities of young Muslims, many of whom were from underprivileged backgrounds. When Pakistan became independent in 1947, Tanvir Ahmad Khan and his parents migrated to Lahore, where Khan continued his schooling, later enrolling at the Government College, Lahore.

Education
Tanvir Ahmad Khan was educated at Government College, Lahore and later continued his studies at Brasenose College, Oxford. At Oxford, Tanvir Ahmad Khan studied English Literature - earning  BA Honours / MA degrees. Thereafter, he returned to Government College, Lahore to teach English Literature at his former alma mater, before leaving academia to join government service.

Career
He retired as the Foreign Secretary of Pakistan. He held various key diplomatic offices during his long career, including serving as ambassador in Moscow (Russian Federation), Paris (France), Tehran (Iran) and Dhaka (Bangladesh). Khan was Foreign Secretary during the Government of Benazir Bhutto (1989–90). 

Dr. Khan worked closely with Sahabzada Yaqub Khan and enjoyed a close friendship with him.

Diplomatic service and public offices
Khan served as Pakistan's ambassador to the Russian Federation, Bangladesh, Czechoslovakia, Iran, France, and was accredited to Ireland and Finland. Before he served as Pakistan's ambassador, he had held senior positions in Pakistan's missions in London, Bonn, Kabul and at the Ministry of Foreign Affairs headquarters in Islamabad (including additional foreign secretary and director general).

Foreign Secretary
Khan served as the 19th Foreign Secretary under the Government of Benazir Bhutto in 1989-90 and twice served as Information Secretary of Pakistan.

Death
After retiring, Khan twice served as chairman and director general of the Institute of Strategic Studies in Islamabad.

Tanvir Ahmad Khan died on 11 November 2013 at age 81 in Islamabad, Pakistan.

Publications
Tanvir Ahmad Khan's articles on foreign affairs and domestic politics have been published in many major newspapers and journals (number of articles estimated to be well over 500) including The Express Tribune (affiliate of the International Herald Tribune), The News International - Islamabad, The Daily Times (Pakistan), Dawn (newspaper)- Karachi, and Gulf News, (UAE).

News media appearances
Before his death during his long career, he used to appear in numerous TV and radio discussions and programmes concerning foreign affairs and international relations including BBC World Service, CNN, Voice of America, NDTV India, Aljazeera (Qatar), PTV News, Geo News, ARY Digital Network, News One and Aaj News. Khan used to also deliver lectures on foreign policy to members of the Pakistan Armed Forces, civil service and  diplomatic corps in Pakistan and at think tanks and universities across Pakistan.

References

|-

High Commissioners of Pakistan to Bangladesh
Ambassadors of Pakistan to France
Ambassadors of Pakistan to Iran
Ambassadors of Pakistan to Finland
Ambassadors of Pakistan to Ireland
Ambassadors of Pakistan to Russia
Foreign Secretaries of Pakistan
1932 births
2013 deaths
Pakistani civil servants
Government College University, Lahore alumni
Alumni of Brasenose College, Oxford
Ambassadors of Pakistan to Czechoslovakia